My Game is an EP by British big beat musician Fatboy Slim, released in 2002.

Track listing 

 "Camber Sands"
 "Drop the Hate (Santos Napalm Reprise)"
 "Song for Shelter (Chemical Brothers mix)"
 "Demons (Stanton Warriors Dub)"
 "Retox (Dave Clarke Mix)"
 "Weapon of Choice (Instrumental version)"

References 

2002 EPs
Fatboy Slim EPs